Fathi Hassan (born 10 May 1957) is an Egyptian-born, Italian-based artist known for his installations involving the written word.

Life 

Fathi Hassan was born in Cairo in 1957 as the second son to a Nubian family. His father Hassan was Sudanese and his mother Fatma was from the Toshka Lakes region in southern Egypt. He attended the Kerabia school in Cairo, where he met the sculptor Ghaleb Khater.

Work 
In 1979, Hassan received a grant from the Italian Cultural Institute in Cairo and moved to Naples. He enrolled at the Accademia di Belle Arti in 1980 to study set design. He graduated in 1984 with a dissertation on the influence of African art in Cubism. While he was studying and in the year after graduation, Hassan also worked as an actor and set designer at RAI (Radiotelevisione Italiana works) in Naples and Rome. In 1986, he moved to Pesaro.

In 1989 Hassan was the first artist of African heritage to be invited to the "Aperto" section of the 43rd Venice Biennale curated by Dan Cameron and Giovanni Carandente. He has exhibited in numerous galleries in Italy, Belgium, Denmark, Germany, France, Egypt, and United States.

Hassan's work often emphasizes power dynamics and the relationship between the oral and written word; drawing from his Nubian heritage, he places particular emphasis on the loss of language under the dominance of colonialism. Most of his scripts are based upon kufic calligraphy, but remain deliberately illegible and impossible to decipher. In his video Blessed Nubia (2002) is an analysis of the original language of Nubia.

Hassan has lived and worked in Italy since 1979, dividing his time between Rome, Milan and Fano.

References

Further reading 

 Eriberto Eulisse (2001). Images of Writing, Writing of Images: The Work of Fathi Hassan . Nka: Journal of Contemporary African Art. Fall/Winter 2001 (15): 30–37. 
 Achille Bonito Oliva (2000). Fathi Hassan (exhibition catalogue). Milan: Charta Art Books. .
 Mary Angela Schroth, Sandra Federici, Andrea Marchesini Reggiani (2000). TransAfricana: artisti contemporanei: Bologna, 15 gennaio–24 febbraio 2000: San Giorgio in Poggiale, Collezioni d'arte e di storia della Fondazione Cassa di Risparmio di Bologna (exhibition catalogue). Bologna: Lai-momo. Pages 47–49, 72–73. (full record )
 Roberto Bencivenga (2002). Fathi Hassan: la sostanza dell'anima = Spirit Matter (exhibition catalogue). Senigallia: Ed. Della Rovere. (no ISBN?).

Egyptian artists
Egyptian people of Nubian descent
Egyptian people of Sudanese descent
1957 births
Living people
Accademia di Belle Arti di Napoli alumni
Egyptian expatriates in Italy
Italian people of Egyptian descent
Italian contemporary artists
Sudanese people of Nubian descent